Events from the year 1794 in Austria

Incumbents
 Monarch – Francis II

Events

 
 

 
 June 17 -  June 26 – Battle of Fleurus: The Austrians and their allies are defeated by France, leading to the  loss of the Austrian Netherlands.
 October 2 – Battle of Aldenhoven: The Austrains retreat from the Roer River, conceding control of the west bank of the Rhine River to France.

Births

Deaths

 
 
 
 
 June 27 - Wenzel Anton, Prince of Kaunitz-Rietberg, Austrian statesman (b. 1711)

References

 
Years of the 18th century in Austria